Bill Curtis (born 1948) is an American software engineer.

Bill Curtis may also refer to:
 Bill Curtis (footballer) (1902–1977), Australian rules footballer for Fitzroy
 Bill Curtis, drummer with the American funk and disco band Fatback Band

See also
 Billy Curtis (1909–1988), American film and television actor
 Bill Kurtis (born 1940), American journalist and radio personality
 William Curtis (disambiguation)
 Curtis (surname)